Ihle is a surname. Notable people with the surname include:

Andrea Ihle (born 1953), German operatic soprano
Andreas Ihle (born 1979), German sprint canoer
Geirmund Ihle (1934–2016), Norwegian politician
Heini Ihle (born 1941), German ski jumper
Johann Eberhard Ihle (1727–1814), German painter
Nico Ihle (born 1985), German speed skater